Frankston can refer to:
Frankston, Victoria, a suburb of Melbourne, Australia
Frankston City, a local government area in the same city
Electoral district of Frankston, an electoral district in Victoria, Australia
Frankston, Texas, a small town in eastern Texas
 Bob Frankston, co-creator of the first spreadsheet program, VisiCalc

See also
Frankton (disambiguation), various places worldwide
Frankeston, a breed of cattle